This is a list of Japanese television dramas often called  by fans.

The list is not complete, and aims to include all those Japanese television dramas that are somehow of interest for Wikipedia contents.

1980s

1980 
Covert Journal of Yukihime's Journey (TBS)
3 nen B gumi Kinpachi Sensei (3年B組金八先生) (TBS)
Hadaka no Taisho Horoki (裸の大将放浪記) (Fuji TV)

1981 
Father's kitchen (おやじの台所) (TV Asahi)
Jikans Season 4 (事件) (NHK)
Kita no Kuni Kara (北の国から) (Fuji TV)

1982 
Hiatari Ryōkō!, based on the manga series of the same name by Mitsuru Adachi

1983 
Oshin, created by Sugako Hashida, starring Ayako Kobayashi and Yūko Tanaka. It is based on the fictional biography of a Japanese woman.

1984 
Sanga Moyu, starring Matsumoto Hakuō II and Kenji Sawada. (NHK)

1985 
Sukeban Deka, based on the manga series of the same name by Shinji Wada
Sukeban Deka II: Shōjo Tekkamen Densetsu
Ponytail wa Furimukanai

1986 
Abunai Deka
Sukeban Deka 3: Shōjo Ninpōjō Denki

1987 
Kamen Rider Black

1990s

1991 
Tokyo Love Story (東京ラブストーリー) starring Yūji Oda, Honami Suzuki

1992 
Sono toki Heartwa Nusumareta (その時ハ-トは盜まれた) - starring Sae Isshiki, Takuya Kimura and Yuki Uchida

1995 
Aishiteiru to Itte Kure (愛していると言ってくれ)

1996 
 Long Vacation – starring Takuya Kimura, Tomoko Yamaguchi, Takako Matsu, Yutaka Takenouchi, Ryō, and Ryōko Hirosue
 Furuhata Ninzaburo - by Kōki Mitani starring Masakazu Tamura, and Masahiko Nishimura.
 Iguana Girl
 Itazura Na Kiss - starring Aiko Sato and Takashi Kashiwabara

1997 
 Bayside Shakedown (踊る大捜査線) - starring Yūji Oda.
 Glass Mask (Series 1) (ガラスの仮面) - starring Yumi Adachi, Megumi Matsumoto, Seiichi Tanabe, and Hinako Saeki
 Love Generation (ラブ ジェネレーション)

1998 
 Glass Mask (Series 2) (ガラスの仮面2) - starring Yumi Adachi, Megumi Matsumoto, Seiichi Tanabe, and Hinako Saeki
 Great Teacher Onizuka - starring Takashi Sorimachi, Nanako Matsushima, Oguri Shun, and Yōsuke Kubozuka
 Shomuni, an office lady comedy starring Makiko Esumi
 Nemureru Mori (A Sleeping Forest), It is written by Nozawa Hisashi, starring Miho Nakayama and Takuya Kimura, and features music by Mariya Takeuchi (Theme song - Camouflage) and U2 (With or Without You).

1999 
  - starring Nanako Matsushima and Hideaki Takizawa
 Ringu- Saishūshō-

2000s

2000 
 Beautiful Life - starring Takuya Kimura, Takako Tokiwa, and Koyuki
 Food Fight - starring Tsuyoshi Kusanagi, Kyoko Fukada, Rie Miyazawa, and Takuya Kimura
 The 6th Sayoko (六番目の小夜子) - starring Suzuki Anne, Chiaki Kuriyama, Takayuki Yamada, Ryo Katsuji, and Marika Matsumoto
 Summer Snow - starring Tsuyoshi Domoto, Ryōko Hirosue, Tsubasa Imai, Ikewaki Chizuru, and Oguri Shun
 Aikotoba wa Yūki - starring Kōji Yakusho, Shingo Katori, Kyōka Suzuki, Akira Terao, Jun Kunimura, Kōichi Yamadera, and Zen Kajiwara
  - starring Tomoya Nagase, Ai Kato, Yamashita Tomohisa, Ken Watanabe, Satoshi Tsumabuki, Yōsuke Kubozuka, Shun Oguri, and Koyuki
 Trick (トリック)- starring Yukie Nakama, Hiroshi Abe

2001 
 Ashita ga Arusa - starring Masatoshi Hamada, Izumi Inamori, Takashi Fujii, Shozo Endo and Naoki Tanaka, and Hitoshi Matsumoto
 Hero - starring Takuya Kimura, Takako Matsu, and Hiroshi Abe
 Strawberry on the Shortcake (ストロベリー・オンザ・ショートケーキ) - starring Hideaki Takizawa, Kyoko Fukada, Yōsuke Kubozuka, and Rina Uchiyama
 The Files of Young Kindaichi (Series 3) (金田一少年の事件簿 thirdseason) - starring Matsumoto Jun, Suzuki Anne, Kazue Fukiishi, and Haruka Ayase
 San nen B-gumi Kinpachi Sensei (Series 6) - starring Tetsuya Takeda, Aya Ueto, Mari Hoshino, Takahisa Masuda, and Shigeaki Kato

2002 
 Artificial Beauty
 Leave It to the Nurses 4 (ナースのお仕事 4) - starring Arisa Mizuki, Yuki Matsushita, Kazue Itō, Naohito Fujiki, and Yumi Adachi
 The Other Side of Midnight (真夜中は別の顔) - starring Asaka Seto, Kōji Kikkawa, Koyuki, Toshiyuki Hosokawa, and Tetsuji Tamayama and features music by Miki Imai (Theme song - Hohoemi no hito) and Maaya Sakamoto (Danieru)
 Morning Musume: Shinshun! Love Stories (モーニング娘。新春! LOVEストーリーズ) - starring Natsumi Abe, Rika Ishikawa, Maki Goto, Ai Takahashi, Risa Niigaki, Makoto Ogawa and Asami Konno
 Season of the Sun (太陽の季節) - starring Hideaki Takizawa, Ikewaki Chizuru, Yoshinori Okada, Rio Matsumoto, Sousuke Takaoka, Marika Matsumoto, Shugo Oshinari, and Kota Yabu
 Kids War 4: Zaken na yo (キッズ・ウォー4 〜ざけんなよ〜) - starring Akiko Ikuina, Yosuke Asari, Mao Inoue, Shota Saito, and Keita Saito
 Sakura (さくら) - starring Shiho Takano, Hiromi Ōta, Asei Kobayashi, Miyoko Asada, and Masami Nagasawa
 The Long Love Letter - starring Takako Tokiwa, Yōsuke Kubozuka, Takayuki Yamada, Yamashita Tomohisa, and Ren Osugi
 Kisarazu Cat's Eye (木更津キャッツアイ) - starring Okada Junichi, Sakurai Sho, Okada Yoshinori, Sato Ryuta, and Tsukamoto Takashi
 Trick 2 (トリック2)- starring Yukie Nakama, Hiroshi Abe

2003 
 Good Luck!! (グッドラック!!) - starring Kimura Takuya and Shibasaki Kou
 Kimi wa Petto (きみはペット) - starring Koyuki and Matsumoto Jun
 Boku dake no Madonna (僕だけのマドンナ) - starring Takizawa Hideaki and Hasegawa Kyoko
 Ōoku (大奥) - starring Miho Kanno, Yuko Asano, Ikewaki Chizuru, Yumi Adachi, Kazuki Kitamura, and Shingo Katsurayama
 Stand Up!! (スタンドアップ！！) - starring Ninomiya Kazunari, Yamashita Tomohisa, Oguri Shun, Narimiya Hiroki, and Suzuki Anne
 Pretty Guardian Sailor Moon (美少女戦士セーラームーン) - starring  Miyuu Sawai, Rika Izumi, Keiko Kitagawa, Mew Azama, and Ayaka Komatsu
 Water Boys (ウォーターボーイズ) - starring Yamada Takayuki
 Shiroi Kyotō（白い巨塔）- starring Toshiaki Karasawa and Yōsuke Eguchi
 Hotman (ホットマン, Hottoman)- starring Takashi Sorimachi, Akiko Yada, Manami Konishi & Nana Yamauchi
 Trick 3 (トリック3) - starring Yukie Nakama, Hiroshi Abe

2004 
 Ace wo Nerae! (エースをねらえ!) - starring Aya Ueto and Natsuki Kato
 Crying Out Love, In the Center of the World (Sekai no Chūshin de Ai wo Sakebu – 世界の中心で、愛をさけぶ) – starring Takayuki Yamada and Haruka Ayase
 Itoshi Kimi e (愛し君へ) – starring Miho Kanno, Naohito Fujiki, Misaki Ito, Hiroshi Tamaki, and Mirai Moriyama
 Minami-kun no Koibito (南くんの恋人) – starring Ninomiya Kazunari, Kyoko Fukada, Mao Miyaji, and Seiichi Tanabe
 Orange Days (オレンジデイズ) - starring Satoshi Tsumabuki, Kou Shibasaki, and Eita
 Pride (プライド) - starring Takuya Kimura and Yūko Takeuchi

 2005 

 2006 

 2007 

 2008 

 2009 

 2010s 

 2010 

 Q1 2010
 Magerarenai Onna - starring Miho Kanno, Hiromi Nagasaku, Shosuke Tanihara and Mayumi Asaka
 Perfect Girl Evolution - starring Kazuya Kamenashi, Aya Ōmasa, Seishiro Kato and Ranko Kanbe
 Code Blue 2 - starring Tomohisa Yamashita, Yui Aragaki, Yosuke Asari and Erika Toda
 Q2 - Q3 2020
 Asu no Hikari o Tsukame Yamato Nadeshiko Shichi Henge Mother 2011 

 2012 

 2013 

 2014 Saigo Kara Nibanme no KoiYowakutemo KatemasuDear SisterWater Polo YankeesMassan 2015 

 2016 
 Specialist, starring Tsuyoshi Kusanagi and Natsuna Watanabe
 Never Let Me Go, starring Haruka Ayase, Haruma Miura, Asami Mizukawa
 Love Song, starring Masaharu Fukuyama, Sakura Fujiwara, Masaki Suda
 Kazoku no Katachi, starring Shingo Katori, Kiko Mizuhara, and Juri Ueno
 Love That Makes You Cry, starring Kasumi Arimura, Mitsuki Takahata, Takahiro Nishijima and Kentaro Sakaguchi
 Summer（July）
 House Selling Lady, starring Keiko Kitagawa, Tōru Nakamura and Yuko Araki
 Girl Who Takes Time, starring Yuina Kuroshima, Fuma Kikuchi and Ryoma Takeuchi
 Hope: Kitai Zero no Shinnyu Shain, starring Yuto Nakajima, Mizuki Yamamoto and Masaki Kaji
 And, There Were None Suki na Hito ga Iru Koto, starring Mirei Kiritani, Kento Yamazaki, Shohei Miura, and Shūhei Nomura

 2017 
 January
 Tokyo Tarareba Musume October
 Kounodori 2018 
 Kuragehime Hana Nochi Hare ~HanaDan Next Season~ City Hunter Descending Stories: Showa Genroku Rakugo Shinju 2019 
 January
 Return of House Selling Lady - starring Keiko Kitagawa, Tōru Nakamura
 Good Wife - starring Takako Tokiwa, Kotaro Koizumi, Toshiaki Karasawa
 Summer（July）
 Voice 110 HQ - starring Toshiaki Karasawa, Yoko Maki 
 October
 Sherlock: Untold Stories - starring Dean Fujioka, Takanori Iwata, Kuranosuke Sasaki

 2020s 

 2020 
 January
 Absolute Zero-Criminal Undercover Investigation (S4) Summer（July）
 Detective Novice - starring Kento Nakajima, Sho Hirano, Michiko Kichise, Yusuke Iseya, and Taizo Harada 
 Hanzawa Naoki 2020 - starring Masato Sakai, Mitsuhiro Oikawa, Kento Kaku, Teruyuki Kagawa, Arata Furuta and Akira Emoto
 Suits Season 2'' - starring Yuji Oda, Yuto Nakajima, Yuko Araki, Anne Nakamura, Shinya Kote, Honami Suzuki, and Kōtarō Yoshida

References

List of Japanese Television Dramas